Franco Varrella (born 25 January 1953) is an Italian football manager and former player. He is best known as the manager of the San Marino national football team.

Varrella was born in Rimini in 1953. His short playing career consisted of a spell with Juventus at youth level before finishing up at Rimini and Jesina.

A lengthy club managerial career followed with spells at Bellaria IM, Santarcangiolese, Forli, Brescia, Monza, Casertana, Salernitana, Reggiana, Savoia, Padova, Triestina, Ravenna and San Marino. He was appointed manager of the San Marino national football team in January 2018.

Managerial statistics

References

1953 births
Living people
People from Rimini
Association football midfielders
Italian footballers
Rimini F.C. 1912 players
Italian football managers
Italian expatriate football managers
Brescia Calcio managers
A.C. Monza managers
U.S. Salernitana 1919 managers
A.C. Reggiana 1919 managers
Calcio Padova managers
U.S. Triestina Calcio 1918 managers
Ravenna F.C. managers
A.S.D. Victor San Marino managers
San Marino national football team managers